Below is the order of battle for the Battle of Barrosa, also known in Spain as the Battle of Chiclana.  The battle took place on 5 March 1811 during the Peninsular War between the Allied Army of Sir Thomas Graham and Manuel Lapeña against the French I Corps of the Armée du Sud (Army of the South) of Marshal Perrin.

I Corps (Army of the South) 

 I Corps, Armée du Sud
 Commanding Officer; Maréchal d'Empire Claude Victor-Perrin, 1er Duc de Belluno
 1st Regiment of Dragoons (3 squadrons)
 2nd Regiment of Dragoons (3 squadrons)
 4 Foot Artillery Batteries
 1st Division; Général de Division François Amable Ruffin
 Combined Grenadiers (2 battalions)
 24th Regiment of Line Infantry (1st and 2nd battalions)
 96th Regiment of Line Infantry (1st battalion)
 9th Regiment of Light Infantry (2nd battalion)
 2nd Division; Général de Division Jean François Leval
 Combined Grenadiers (1 battalion)
 45th Regiment of Line Infantry (1st battalion)
 54th Regiment of Line Infantry (1st and 2nd battalions)
 8th Regiment of Line Infantry (1st and 2nd battalions)
 3rd Division; Général de Division Eugène-Casimir Villatte, Comte d'Oultremont
 94th Regiment of Line Infantry (1st and 2nd battalions)
 95th Regiment of Line Infantry (1st and 2nd battalions)
 27th Regiment of Light Infantry (1 battalion)

Allied Army 

 Commanding Officer; Lieutenant General Thomas Graham (British)
 British Forces
 2nd Hussars (King's German Legion) (2 squadrons)
 Browne's Flank Battalion — Formed from the flank companies (Grenadier and Light Infantry) of the following:
 1st Battalion, 9th (East Norfolk) Regiment of Foot
 1st Battalion, 28th (North Gloucestershire) Regiment of Foot
 2nd Battalion, 82nd Regiment of Foot (Prince of Wales's Volunteers)
 Barnard's Flank Battalion
 2nd Battalion, 47th (Lancashire) Regiment of Foot (flank companies)
 20th Portuguese Infantry Regiment (4 coys)
 3rd Battalion, 95th Regiment of Foot (Riflemen) (4 coys)
 362 men of the Royal Artillery — commanded by Major Alexander Duncan (unknown units)
 96 men of the Corps of Royal Sappers and Miners and Staff
 Dilke's Brigade; Brigadier General William Thomas Dilke
 2nd Battalion, 1st Regiment of Foot Guards
 2nd Battalion, Coldstream Regiment of Foot Guards (2 coys)
 2nd Battalion, 3rd Regiment of Foot Guards (3 coys)
 2nd Battalion, 95th Regiment of Foot (Riflemen) (2 coys)
 Wheatley's Brigade; Brigadier General Henry Wheatley
 1st Battalion, 28th (North Gloucestershire) Regiment of Foot (8 coys)
 2nd Battalion, 67th (South Hampshire) Regiment of Foot
 2nd Battalion, 87th (The Prince of Wales's Own Irish) Regiment of Foot
 Spanish Forces; Teniente General Manuel Lapeña Rodríguez y Ruiz de Sotillo
 14 guns from the Real Cuerpo de Artillería
 four squadrons of cavalry
 1st Division; General de División Manuel de Lardizábal y Uribe
 Campomayor Infantry Regiment (2 battalions)
 Carmona Infantry Regiment (2 battalions)
 Murcia Infantry Regiment (2 battalions)
 Canaris Infantry Regiment (1 battalion)
 2nd Division; General de División Pedro de Alcántara Téllez-Girón, Príncipe de Anglona
 African Infantry Regiment (2 battalions)
 Siguenza Infantry Regiment (2 battalions)
 Cantabrian Infantry Regiment (2 battalions)
 Volunteers of Valencia (1 battalion)

Footnotes

References 

 
 

Barrosa